Gultekin Uysal (born 1976 in İscehisar, Afyonkarahisar Province, Turkey) is a Turkish politician and businessman who has been the chairman of the Democratic Party (DP), since May 2012. In 2018 election he was elected on the İYİ Party list but then he rejoined his party.

Biography 
Gültekin Uysal was born in 1976 in İscehisar, Afyonkarahisar Province, Turkey. He graduated Department of Political Science and Public Administration from Bilkent University.

References

1976 births
Bilkent University alumni
21st-century Turkish politicians
Living people
People from İscehisar
21st-century Turkish businesspeople